Riparbella is a comune (municipality) of 1,630 inhabitants of the Province of Pisa in the Italian region Tuscany, located about  southwest of Florence and about  southeast of Pisa.

Notable people
Gaetano Bardini (born 1929), tenor

References

External links

 Official website

Cities and towns in Tuscany